National Council elections were held in Bhutan for the first time on 31 December 2007, having been originally scheduled for 26 December. The new National Council had 25 members, which 20 members were directly elected from 20 dzongkhags by 312,817 eligible voters, and five more were appointed by the Druk Gyalpo. Nominations had to be filed by 27 November 2007, and the campaigning for 15 of the 20 dzongkhags took place from 30 November until 31 December 2007.

The elections were not held in five dzongkhags (Thimphu, Trashiyangtse, Gasa, Haa and Lhuntse) on 31 December 2007 since they either did not have any candidate or had only a single candidate till the last date for filing the nominations and the election rules state that there should be at least two candidates for each dzongkhag, otherwise the election would be postponed for that particular dzongkhag. The elections in these five dzongkhags were held on 29 January 2008.

Election procedure
In contrast to the National Assembly's 47 party-based members, the National Council members were elected on a non-party basis and were meant to be eminent people from civil society. The two conditions laid down for the candidature for the National Council of Bhutan were non-affiliation to any political party and the minimum qualification of graduation from a university. The candidates for a particular dzongkhag were selected through the '' (meetings) convened in each gewog of that dzongkhag specifically for this purpose.

Candidates
A total of 43 candidates contested in 15 dzongkhags in the elections were held on 31 December 2007. The highest number of candidates were in Samtse, Dagana, Mongar and Paro with four candidates each. Samdrup Jongkhar, Sarpang, Trongsa, Punakha and Trashigang had three candidates each. Chukha, Pemagatsel, Tsirang, Bumthang, Wangduephodrang and Zhemgang had two candidates each.

A total of 48 candidates filed their nominations for this election by 27 November 2007:

The candidature of Thinley Dorji from Chapcha gewog of Chukha dzongkhag was cancelled by the Election Commission of Bhutan because of his affiliation to a political party on 7 December 2007.

After an additional nomination period, the candidates for the five dzongkhags which had postponed their elections were as follows:

Results
The 15 members of the National Council of Bhutan who were elected on 31 December 2007 were:

In the remaining five dzongkhags, the following candidates were elected:

† elected unopposed

References

2007
2007 elections in Asia
2008 elections in Asia
National Council election
National Council election
Non-partisan elections
December 2007 events in Asia
January 2008 events in Asia